Deeplana is known as village of doctors. It is situated in Nohar tehsil in the Hanumangarh district 335504 in the Indian state of Rajasthan.

Villages in Hanumangarh district